Evan George Maguire (born 26 May 1942) is a New Zealand long-distance runner. He competed in the men's 10,000 metres at the 1968 Summer Olympics.

References

1942 births
Living people
Athletes (track and field) at the 1968 Summer Olympics
New Zealand male long-distance runners
Olympic athletes of New Zealand
Place of birth missing (living people)